Joseph Thomas Lord Jr. (December 28, 1922 – December 1986) was an American professional basketball player. He played for the Rochester Royals for four games in the National Basketball League during the 1947–48 season and averaged 1.5 points per game. He also played in the Eastern Professional Basketball League (EPBL), where he was selected as a member of the All-EPBL First Team in 1949.

References

1922 births
1986 deaths
All-American college men's basketball players
American men's basketball players
American military personnel of World War II
Basketball players from Pennsylvania
Guards (basketball)
Rochester Royals players
People from Norristown, Pennsylvania
Pottsville Packers players
Villanova Wildcats men's basketball players